Adrenalin Baby is a live album by English musician Johnny Marr. It was released on 9 October 2015 by New Voodoo Records. The album was recorded at the Manchester Apollo, Glasgow Academy and Brixton Academy shows. It peaked at number 96 in the UK Albums Chart.

Background
Adrenalin Baby was recorded live during the Playland tour in 2014. The Playland tour was extensive and included, amongst others, dates in the United States, England, the Netherlands, Germany and France. Of Adrenalin Baby, Marr said that he had “wanted to capture the atmosphere and feeling of the last couple of tours”.  The album features live versions of tracks from both Marr’s solo records Playland, The Messenger, and renditions of songs from earlier on in his career, such as “Getting Away With It”, which he released with New Order’s Bernard Sumner as Electronic. Adrenalin Baby also features The Smiths songs "The Headmaster Ritual", "Bigmouth Strikes Again", "There Is a Light That Never Goes Out" and "How Soon Is Now?"

Critical reception
Adrenalin Baby received positive reviews from different music critics. The NME saying Marr “proves his greatness on a spiky live album”  and at Metacritic, which assigns a rating out of 100 to reviews from critics, the album scored an average rating of 73.

Track listing

Personnel
Credits are adapted from liner notes of Adrenalin baby.

Musicians
 Johnny Marr – vocals, guitars, production
 James Doviak – keyboards, guitars, backing vocals, production
 Iwan Gronow – bass, backing vocals
 Jack Mitchell – drums

Additional personnel
 Johnny Marr and Doviak – mixing
 Frank Arkwright – mastering
 Joe Moss – management
 Dave Cronen – management

Artwork personnel
 Nile Marr – cover shot
 Mat Bancroft and Laura Turner – layout
 Pat Graham, Elspeth Moore and Ian Thriller – Photography

References

2015 live albums
Live alternative rock albums
Johnny Marr albums
Warner Records live albums